Domen Prevc (born 4 June 1999) is a Slovenian ski jumper.

Career

2015: World Cup debut
Prevc competed in the 2015 European Youth Olympic Winter Festival. He made an individual World Cup debut on 22 November 2015 in Klingenthal with eighth place. He needed only four World Cup starts to reach his first podium on 19 December 2015 in Engelberg where he took second place. At that event, Domen and Peter Prevc shared a podium as the first brothers in the World Cup history.

2016: First win and yellow bib
Prevc won his first World Cup individual event on 25 November 2016 at the 2016–17 season opening in Kuusamo/Ruka, and therefore wore yellow bib as the World Cup overall leader for the first time in his career. Soon after that he won another three December World Cup individual events in Klingenthal, Lillehammer and Engelberg.

2017: Ski flying debut
On 28 January 2017 in Willingen, together with his brothers Cene and Peter, he represented the Slovenian national team in the team event of the World Cup.

Despite his age, he competed for the first time in his career at the ski flying event in Oberstdorf on 3 February 2017. On 19 March 2017 in Vikersund, he improved his personal best jump to 243.5 metres (798 ft).

Personal life
Prevc was born in Kranj to Božidar and Julijana Prevc; the family has since been living in the village of Dolenja Vas. He has two brothers and two sisters. Both his brothers, Peter and Cene, and one of his sisters, Nika, are also FIS Ski Jumping World Cup jumpers. His father, who owns a furniture business, is also an international ski jumping referee.

World Cup

Standings

Individual victories

Individual starts

References

External links

1999 births
Living people
Sportspeople from Kranj
Slovenian male ski jumpers
Prevc family
21st-century Slovenian people